Sven Bertil Uno Carlsson (5 March 1901 – 23 February 1959) was a Swedish weightlifter. He competed in the middleweight division at the 1928 Summer Olympics, but failed to finish.

References

1901 births
1975 deaths
Olympic weightlifters of Sweden
Weightlifters at the 1928 Summer Olympics
Swedish male weightlifters
People from Huskvarna
Sportspeople from Jönköping County
20th-century Swedish people